"Cigarette Burns" is the eighth episode of the first season of Masters of Horror. It originally aired in North America on December 16, 2005.

Synopsis
Deeply in debt to his dead wife's father, rare-films dealer Kirby Sweetman (Norman Reedus) has less than a month to produce $200,000 to save his small theater. An old cinephile, Mr. Bellinger (Udo Kier), hires him to find the sole print of a rare 30-year-old film titled La Fin Absolue du Monde. The film supposedly sparked a homicidal riot during its premiere, after which it was destroyed.

Bellinger leads Sweetman to a hidden room in his mansion, which contains an emaciated, pale man (Christopher Redman) in chains. The wounds on the man's shoulders appear to be the source of a pair of angelic wings. The chained man explains that his existence is bound to that of the film. Bellinger offers Sweetman $100,000 to find the film, which Sweetman increases to $200,000. Sweetman's first lead is a reclusive critic who wrote a review of the film. The critic, who has become obsessed with the film to the point of madness, gives Sweetman an audiotape of an interview with the film's director.

Sweetman listens to the tape and hallucinates his wife's suicide. The following day, Sweetman meets with film archivist Henri Cotillard (Julius Chapple) who tells him that he was the projectionist at a secret screening of the film. He was spared death and insanity because he turned away as the film played. Eventually, he tried to stop it but blacked out, only to wake up with his left hand burned. He sends Sweetman to a contact, a filmmaker named Dalibor (Douglas Arthurs) who might know where the film is. Sweetman is seized, injected with an anesthetic, and blacks out, waking up tied to a chair. The filmmaker explains to Sweetman (while decapitating a woman sitting across from him) that an angel was sacrificed in the film, and the evil of that horror affects all who view the film. Sweetman experiences another vision, and, when he comes to, he finds himself holding a machete. The filmmaker has his throat slashed. Before the man dies, he directs him to Katja, the director's widow.

Sweetman tracks down and speaks with Katja (Gwynyth Walsh). She gives Sweetman the only remaining copy of the film. When he asks how the director died, Katja reveals that he died in an attempted murder-suicide that she survived. Sweetman brings the film to Bellinger and collects his payment. Bellinger sees the angel's mutilation in the film. Sweetman learns that his father-in-law has locked the theater despite saying he has two weeks to pay off his debt. He receives a phone call from a distraught Bellinger and returns to the mansion. There, Sweetman sees Bellinger's butler gouges his own eyes out after watching the film. Inside the projection room, Bellinger loads his own intestines into the reels of another projector.

Sweetman's father-in-law, who tracked him to the mansion, pulls a gun and threatens to kill Sweetman. As they struggle, they hallucinate a cue mark, which envelops the screen. Sweetman awakens to find both he and his father-in-law watching the movie, both bloody. The butler frees the chained angel. Sweetman's wife appears and bites her father's neck which turns out to be a hallucination. Sweetman decides that he and his father-in-law both have to die because neither can truly let her go as long as they are alive. Sweetman brutally kills his father-in-law and commits suicide.

The angel takes the two film reels, walks into the theater, looks at Sweetman's bloody corpse, and says, "Thank you for this," indicating the film reels, before leaving.

Home media
The DVD was released by Anchor Bay Entertainment on March 28, 2006. The episode was the eighth episode and the first to be released on DVD. The episode appears on the first volume of the Blu-ray Disc compilation of the series.

Reception 
Nich Schager of Slant Magazine wrote that the film lacks Carpenters "trademark cinemascope cinematography" and is too overt, but it is "something of an atmospheric semi-return to form".  Steve Barton of Dread Central rated it 5/5 stars and called it "vintage Carpenter": "gory, disturbing, and at times beautiful to look at".  Michael Drucker of IGN rated it 8/10 stars and described it as "fun, exciting, and horrifying", though he criticized the scenes of La Fin Absolue du Monde as poorly done.  Ian Jane of DVD Talk rated it 3/5 stars and concluded that it is a "nice return to form from Carpenter that, despite some flaws, makes for an unsettling and atmospheric viewing".

See also
Fury of the Demon (2016)

References

External links
 

Masters of Horror episodes
2005 American television episodes
Fiction about snuff films

it:Episodi di Masters of Horror (prima stagione)#Cigarette Burns - Incubo mortale
pt:Cigarette Burns